The Akwesasne Freedom School was founded in 1979 by the Mohawk tribe. The Akwesasne Freedom school is located in St. Regis Mohawk Reservation (also known as Hagensborg), New York. The school was founded by the Mohawk nation, with the intention of strengthening the Mohawk culture which was once in danger of being extinct. The Akwesasne Freedom School focuses on educating children of the Mohawk tribe in the culture, language, and other customs.

History 
Freedom school originated during the Civil Rights Movements. Freedom schools were created to give African Americans an opportunity to attend school. These freedom schools educated African Americans on different aspects of life such as social, political, and economical so that they could prosper in the United States. The Akwesasne Freedom School had a similar intention in creating an education system for the Mohawk people in order to give them the opportunity to prosper in the United States while also retaining their cultural practices and native language. The Akwesasne Freedom School was created as a place for the Mohawk community to immerse themselves into a Mohawk education in order to prevent the Mohawk culture from being extinct. The Akwesasne Freedom School has been able to sustain itself without government funding for over 40 years.

Education Approach

Curriculum 
The Akwesasne Freedom School provides students with the opportunity to learn different subjects such as science, social studies, mathematics and how these subjects are related and important to Mohawk culture. The school focuses on developing students' public speaking skills so that the students can communicate effectively in real world settings. The school begins their day with the Thanksgiving Address, where students recite this at the start of the day. Classes are also taught in their native language. The school emphasizes the importance of speaking the Mohawk language in order to keep the Mohawk culture alive.

Physical Education 
The Akwesasne Freedom School hosts the Akwesasne Freedom School (AFS) Survival Race every year. This race challenges students to do different physical activities. The school currently does not have a gymnasium but is working towards collecting funds in order to create a gymnasium.

Mohawk Philosophy 
The Quakers are a religious group that follow Christian beliefs also known as the Religious Society of Friends. Quakers and Mohawks have similar beliefs and views on life. Quakers and Mohawks believe that leaders are not chosen and cannot be voted in, but rather are individuals who have leadership characteristics that allow them to be strong leaders. Mohawk and Quakers believe in a Creator of the world and that the Creator made this world and it is their duty to take care of this world so that future generations and inhabitants of this world will be able to live in for many generations to come.

The Akwesasne Freedom School focuses on teaching students the importance of the Mohawk and Quaker beliefs of the creation of the world. This is because Mohawks believe that it is their responsibility to take care and preserve the health of their land for generations to come. Akwesasne Freedom School teaches students the importance of preservation in order to prevent the extinction of any creation. The Mohawk and Quaker Philosophy plays an important role as the foundation for students' education at the Akwesasne Freedom School.

Demographics 
The Akwesasne Freedom School provides education to children between kindergarten and 8th grade. The grades are not based on age, but rather on speaking ability of the Mohawk language, so it is possible to have an adult in a “2nd grade” class because they have a 2nd grade speaking level of the Mohawk language. The student to teacher class ratio in the Akwesasne Freedom School is about 11:1. The classes are small in order to better engage with the students and improve their cultural awareness and language skills. There are currently about 61 students enrolled at the Akwesasne Freedom School. Since the Akwesasne Freedom School only offers grades K-8th, students must leave the reservation to attend a traditional high school elsewhere.

Finances 
The Akwesasne Freedom School does not accept funds from the US and Canadian government. The Akwesasne Freedom School is a non-profit organization and receives its funding from fundraisers, donations, and student’s tuition that is administered by The Friends of the Akwesasne Freedom School (FOAFS).

References